Johann Horkel (8 September 1769 in Burg auf Fehmarn – 15 November 1846 in Berlin) was a German physician and botanist.

From 1787 he studied medicine at the University of Halle, where in 1802 he was named an associate professor. From 1804 to 1810 he served as a full professor of medicine at Halle, afterwards relocating to Berlin, where he spent the rest of his career as a professor of plant physiology. In 1800/01 he was editor of the journal Archiv für die thierische Chemie, and for a period of time, was an editor of the Deutsches Archiv für die Physiologie.

He was an uncle and a significant influence to the career of botanist Matthias Jakob Schleiden. The botanical genera Horkelia (Cham. & Schltdl.) and Horkeliella (Rydb.) commemorate his name, as does the fish species Rhinobatos horkelii (Brazilian guitarfish).

References

1769 births
1846 deaths
People from Fehmarn
18th-century German botanists
Plant physiologists
Academic staff of the University of Halle
Academic staff of the Humboldt University of Berlin
19th-century German botanists